John Broadbent (1872–1938) was British Army officer and Conservative politician.

John Broadbent may also refer to:
John Raymond Broadbent (Quartermaster-General) (1893–1972), Australian Army officer, Quartermaster-General
John Raymond Broadbent (Major General) (1914–2006), Australian Army officer, C.O. 17/18 Bt.
Sir John Broadbent, 2nd Baronet (died 1946), English physician
Ed Broadbent (John Edward Broadbent, born 1936), Canadian politician and political scientist

See also
Broadbent